Mercantile Bank Building or Mercantile National Bank Building may refer to:

Mercantile Bank Building (Jonesboro, Arkansas), listed on the NRHP in Craighead County, Arkansas
 Mercantile National Bank Building (Dallas, Texas), also known as Mercantile Bank Building
Mercantile Bank building (Tampa, Florida), a historic bank building set to be remodeled for use as a hotel